Caistor was a rural district in Lincolnshire, Parts of Lindsey from 1894 to 1974.

It was formed by the Local Government Act 1894 from Caistor rural sanitary district.  It entirely surrounded, but did not include, the town of Market Rasen.

It was abolished in 1974 under the Local Government Act 1972, becoming part of the West Lindsey district.

References

https://web.archive.org/web/20071001030246/http://www.visionofbritain.org.uk/relationships.jsp?u_id=10027111&c_id=10001043

Districts of England created by the Local Government Act 1894
Districts of England abolished by the Local Government Act 1972
Rural districts of Lindsey